Lakey is a surname. Notable people with the surname include:

Alice Lakey (1857–1935), Activist in the pure food movement
Andy Lakey (1959–2012), American artist
Claude R. Lakey (1910–1990), American saxophonist, trumpeter, and arranger
Gabriel Isaac Lakey (born 1996), Film Director, cinematographer, and screenwriter from Portland, Oregon
George Lakey (born 1937), Activist, sociologist, and writer
John and Laura Lakey, Artists whose work have appeared in role-playing games
Leanne Lakey (born 1978), British actress, played Belinda Peacock in EastEnders
Thomas Lakey (1874–1932), English professional footballer
Todd Lakey, American politician from Portland, Oregon
Lakey Peterson (born 1994), American surfer ranked #1 by the World Surf League

See also
Lackey (disambiguation)
Lakhey
Leakey (surname)